Carley Watts was an English glamour and lingerie model.

She temporarily abandoned modelling after it was reported in the press in August 2013 that she was to convert to Islam and move to Monastir. However, she confirmed she was single in February 2014 and still resides in England. Watts later commented that press coverage "did have a knock on effect on the relationship which is why I decided to eventually end it. Sometimes loving someone is not enough to make things work when there are so many other people and cultural differences involved".

References

1989 births
Living people
People from Allerdale
English female models